Dee Sterling (born February 3, 1986 in Kingston, Ontario) is a professional Canadian football defensive lineman who is currently a free agent. He most recently played for the Edmonton Eskimos of the Canadian Football League. He was drafted by the Eskimos in the second round of the 2009 CFL Draft. He played CIS football for the Queen's Golden Gaels.

He was released by the Eskimos on May 23, 2012.

References

1986 births
Living people
Canadian football defensive linemen
Edmonton Elks players
Players of Canadian football from Ontario
Queen's Golden Gaels football players
Sportspeople from Kingston, Ontario